Omara Durand Elías (born 26 November 1991) is a visually impaired Cuban sprinter, who competes in T12 and T13 events. At the 2012 Summer Paralympics in London, she won gold medals in the 100 m – T13 and 400 m – T13 competitions. At the 2016 Rio Paralympics she won the 100 m – T12 event, setting a new world record at 11.40.  At the 2020 Summer Paralympics, she won a gold medal in the Women's 400m T12.

Career 
She competed at the 2011 World Championships, 2015 Parapan American Games, and 2015 Doha World Championships,

Following the 2016 Paralympics, Durand was named Best Female at the Paralympic Sport Awards.

Notes

References

External links

 

Paralympic athletes of Cuba
Paralympic gold medalists for Cuba
Living people
1991 births
World record holders in Paralympic athletics
Medalists at the 2008 Summer Paralympics
Medalists at the 2012 Summer Paralympics
Medalists at the 2016 Summer Paralympics
Medalists at the 2020 Summer Paralympics
Athletes (track and field) at the 2008 Summer Paralympics
Athletes (track and field) at the 2012 Summer Paralympics
Athletes (track and field) at the 2016 Summer Paralympics
Athletes (track and field) at the 2020 Summer Paralympics
Paralympic Sport Awards — Best Female winners
World Para Athletics Championships winners
Paralympic medalists in athletics (track and field)
Medalists at the 2007 Parapan American Games
Medalists at the 2011 Parapan American Games
Medalists at the 2015 Parapan American Games
Medalists at the 2019 Parapan American Games
Cuban female sprinters
21st-century Cuban women